Fortunatus is a Latin word meaning "happy, lucky, rich, blessed". A masculine given name, it can refer to:

Saints
 Fortunatus the Apostle, one of the 70 Disciples of Jesus Christ, companion of Achaicus of Corinth
 Fortunatus (1st century), martyred with SS Orontius and Justus
 Fortunatus (died c. 70), a deacon martyred with Hermagoras of Aquileia
 Fortunatus (died 212), martyred with SS Felix and Achilleus
 Fortunatus of Casei (died 286), a martyr
 Fortunatus (died 303), a deacon martyred with SS Felix of Thibiuca, Audactus, Januarius, and Septimus
 Fortunatus of Naples, 4th century bishop of Naples
 Fortunatus of Spoleto (died 400), a priest near Montefalco
 Fortunatus of Todi (died 537), bishop of Todi
 Venantius Fortunatus (died in the early 7th century), a poet and bishop of Poitiers

Other
 Fortunatus Dwarris (1786–1860), English lawyer and author
 Fortunatus Hueber (1639–1706), German Franciscan historian and theologian
 Fortunatus M. Lukanima (1940–2014), Roman Catholic bishop
 Fortunatus Nwachukwu (born 1960), Roman Catholic apostolic nuncio to various Caribbean nations
 Fortunatus Wright (1712–1757), English privateer
 Emerich Szerencsés (died 1526), known as Fortunatus, deputy treasurer of the Kingdom of Hungary and a Jewish convert to Christianity
 Heinrich Glücksmann (1864–1947),  Moravian-born Austrian author who used the pseudonym Fortunatus

Fictional characters
 the protagonist of Fortunatus, a German proto-novel or chapbook about a legendary hero popular in 15th- and 16th-century Europe
 the protagonist of Old Fortunatus, a 1599 play by Thomas Dekker
 a character in "King Fortunatus's Golden Wig", a French fairy tale

See also
 Venantius Fortunatus (530–600), Latin poet and hymnodist, bishop and saint
 Edward Fortunatus (1565–1600), Margrave of Baden-Rodemachern and Baden-Baden
 Herman Fortunatus, Margrave of Baden-Rodemachern (1595–1665), son of Edward Fortunatus
 Publius Aelius Fortunatus, 2nd century Roman painter

Masculine given names